Haryana Legislative Assembly election, 1996 were held in Indian state of Haryana to elect 90 members of the state's legislative assembly. The 90 members were elected by First-past-the-post system from 90 constituencies.

Haryana Vikas Party' Bansi Lal was elected Chief Minister of Haryana after his party gained majority seats with help of Bharatiya Janta Party.

Results

!colspan=10|
|-
!colspan=2|Party
!Candidates
!Seats won
!Votes
!Vote %
|-
| 
|align="left"|Haryana Vikas Party
||65		
||33
||17,16,572
||22.7%
|-
| 
|align="left"|Samta Party
||89	
||24
||15,57,914
||20.6%
|-
| 
|align="left"|Bharatiya Janata Party
||25
||11
||6,72,558
||8.9%
|-
| 
|align="left"|Independent
||2022
||10
||11,73,533
||15.5%
|-
| 
|align="left"|Indian National Congress
||90	
||9
||15,76,882
||20.8%
|-
| 
|align="left"|All India Indira Congress (Tiwari)
||62		
||3
||2,42,638
||3.2%
|-
|}

Elected members

Bye Elections

References

1996
1996
Haryana
1996 in Indian politics